Trachinocephalus trachinus, also known as the Indo-Pacific blunt-nose lizardfish is a species of fish in the family Synodontidae found in Indo-Pacific. Although previously synonymized with T. myops, Polanco et al. (2016) demonstrated that the two are distinct in the number of lateral-line scales and other meristics, and resurrected T. trachinus for the Indo-Pacific population. This species grows to a length of  TL.

References

Synodontidae
Fish of the Pacific Ocean
Fish described in 1846